Jaffar Omran (born 1 July 1966) is a former Iraqi football forward who played for Iraq in the 1994 FIFA World Cup qualification. He played for the national team between 1989 and 1993.

In a 1993 final match, Jaffar scored the last minute equalising goal which denied Japan a spot at the 1994 FIFA World Cup.

Career statistics

International goals
Scores and results list Iraq's goal tally first.

References

Iraqi footballers
Iraq international footballers
Living people
1966 births
Association football forwards